PlanToys is a toy manufacturer located in Trang,Thailand. It was founded in 1981 by Vitool Viraponsavan. They are a sustainable toy manufacturer and use rubberwood, a sustainable by-product of the latex industry's harvesting of trees used for natural rubber production once their productivity declines. as their primary manufacturing material.  Using the trees as a resource in this way for wooden toys made by PlanToys is environmentally responsible. Plan Toys uses preservative-free rubberwood and non-formaldehyde glues, as well as recyclable packaging and water-based inks. Their products are marketed as "green", and are recognized as such by various buying guides endorsing green products for children.

Distribution
Starting in January 2002, PlanToys products were distributed worldwide by Swedish company BRIO. After the downfall of BRIO US in 2006, Plan Toys opened its own distribution unit in the US.  Distribution in the whole of Europe is by PlanToys Europe (PTE). PlanToys is present in Japan with a company called PlanToys Japan.

Products
In 2009, PlanToys collaborated with French design school École Camondo to produce two toys that promote the discovery of nature: Louis the Elephant and Tsu Tsu the rolling rattle.

References

External links
 Plan Toys

Toy companies of Thailand
Companies established in 1981
1981 establishments in Thailand